Milk & Kisses is the eighth and final studio album by Scottish alternative rock band Cocteau Twins, issued by Fontana Records in March 1996. It proved to be their last; a meeting two years later to record a new album ended with the breakup of the band.

Background and recording

The song "Rilkean Heart" was an homage to Jeff Buckley, who was a lifelong lover of the work of poet Rainer Maria Rilke.

The Japanese edition of Milk & Kisses contained two bonus tracks ("Flock Of Soul" and "Primitive Heart"). The Hong Kong edition contained a duet version of "Serpentskirt" sung by Elizabeth Fraser with C-pop artist Faye Wong. Wong later recorded an acoustic version of "Rilkean Heart" for her 1997 album Faye Wong, on which Guthrie and Raymonde also wrote a new song, "Yu Le Chang" ("Amusement Park"), for her. In 2013, Sarah Brightman covered their song "Eperdu" on her album Dreamchaser.

The album was released by Fontana Records, their second release under the label following the release of their 1993 studio album Four Calendar Cafe. The album was released during a time of pressure and fragmented relations between the band and their label, with bassist Simon Raymonde claiming that the band should "never have signed the deal", claiming that the record label worked in a very different manner than that of the band, and that the Cocteau Twins were unable to replicate previous sales and success, which appeared to be a disappointment to the record label.

Release and reception

Speaking during the 25th anniversary of the albums release in 2021, bassist Simon Raymonde stated "I don’t think the recordings [on Milk and Kisses] are anywhere near the best we did by any stretch of the imagination. I think the songwriting was good, but I always felt the record sounded muffled. The remastering has actually helped that, which is something I almost never say. I do have a lot of great memories of it, because as you know it turned out to be our last record.”

The recording process for Milk and Kisses was a lot smoother and more productive than the previous recording sessions for the bands last album, Four Calendar Cafe (1993), which was recorded and released following the end of Fraser's and Guthrie's 13 year relationship. During the recording sessions for the previous album, the band tried to avoid each other, frequently spending time in the studio on separate occasions, fearing that the band would be unable to work together to complete Milk and Kisses. By 1995, the band seemed to be in a position where they were willing to work and spend time together again, and began the recording process for the album. "We worked quite closely together on this record, which we hadn’t done so much on the previous one" stated Raymonde, further claiming that "Robin and Liz had broken up and it was a complex time. But I actually think the band was in a really good place during Milk & Kisses. Some time had passed and they were both in relationships with different people. All of the rawness was gone from their relationship. Ironically, Liz left a year or so after we finished it."

Track listing
All songs written by Elizabeth Fraser, Robin Guthrie and Simon Raymonde.

"Violaine" – 3:45
"Serpentskirt" – 3:57
"Tishbite" – 3:50
"Half-Gifts" – 4:18
"Calfskin Smack" – 4:58
"Rilkean Heart" – 4:02
"Ups" – 3:34
"Eperdu" – 4:38
"Treasure Hiding" – 4:55
"Seekers Who Are Lovers" – 4:45

Personnel
 Cocteau Twins – production, engineering
 Des Ward – engineering
 Lincoln Fong – engineering
 Mitsuo Tate – engineering
 Spiros Politis – photography

Charts

References 

Cocteau Twins albums
1996 albums
Faye Wong
Fontana Records albums